The International Journal of Dermatology is a peer-reviewed monthly journal covering all aspects of dermatology. According to the Journal Citation Reports, the journal has a 2014 impact factor of 1.312. The journal is indexed in Current Contents, Index Medicus, and the Science Citation Index.

References

English-language journals
Dermatology journals
Publications established in 1963
Monthly journals
Wiley-Blackwell academic journals
Academic journals associated with international learned and professional societies